Song Han-Ki (born August 7, 1988) is a South Korean football player.

Club statistics

External links
 
 

1988 births
Living people
Association football defenders
South Korean footballers
South Korean expatriate footballers
J2 League players
K League 2 players
Korea National League players
Shonan Bellmare players
Kamatamare Sanuki players
Goyang Zaicro FC players
Expatriate footballers in Japan
South Korean expatriate sportspeople in Japan